The Idan Raichel Project is the debut album by the Idan Raichel Project. Raichel composed and arranged many of the tracks, performed vocals and keyboards, while collaborating with other vocalists and musicians. Singles from the album include "Boi" (בואי / Come), "Im Telech" (אם תלך / If You Go) and "M'dab'rim B'sheket" (מדברים בשקט / Speaking Quietly).

While the majority of Raichel's songs are in Hebrew, a few are entirely in Amharic, while others include small passages in Amharic, by male and female voices, setting traditional-sounding tunes to modern music. Love songs predominate, including "Hinech Yafah" (הינך יפה / Thou art Fair), based on the Song of Songs, while the opening track, "B'rachot L'shanah Chadashah" (ברכות לשנה חדשה / Blessings for a new year), reaches into the depths of Jewish liturgy, sampling voices reciting traditional Jewish blessings.

The album was certified 3× platinum, selling over 120,000 copies in Israel.

Track listing
 "Blessing for the New Year" (3:31) ברכות לשנה החדשה
 "Boee" (4:25) בואי
 "Im Telech" (2:48) אם תלך
 "Ayal-Ayale" (3:35)
 "Hinach Yafa" (4:53) הנך יפה
 "Brong Faya" (4:05)
 "Medabrim Besheket" (3:54) מדברים בשקט
 "Shoshanim Atzuvot" (2:35) שושנים עצובות
 "Tigest" (4:37) טיגסט
 "Mimi's Song" (2:32) השיר של מימי
 "Et Lihyot, Et Lamut" (3:52) עת לחיות, עת למות
 "Boee (Radio)" (4:07) בואי (רדיו)

References

2002 debut albums
Idan Raichel albums
Helicon Records albums